Newswipe with Charlie Brooker is a British news review comedy programme broadcast on BBC Four during 2009 and 2010 which was written and presented by Charlie Brooker. It is similar to Brooker's Screenwipe series which is also shown on BBC Four. A first series of six episodes ran between 25 March 2009 and 29 April 2009. A second series began on 19 January 2010 and concluded on 23 February 2010.

Format
The aim of Newswipe was to expose the inner workings of news media, just as Screenwipe does to television in general.

The series was a comic, thoughtful and acerbic analysis of recent news coverage. Newswipe also looked at the way the news is presented to the public. Experts were on hand to pick apart certain stories and analysed the news media's obsessions.

Charlie Brooker commented: "This is new territory for me: I'm no current affairs expert. Just like, I suspect, many people, when I tune into the news I often feel like I've wandered into episode 389 of the world's most complex soap opera. So it's also about me trying to make sense of a bewildering and often bloody stupid world."

Like Screenwipe, much of the programme was filmed in Brooker's living room, with shots of him sitting in front of his TV (and laptop) with remote in hand talking to camera, occasionally bellowing insults or sarcastic comments at whatever happens to be shown at the time, interspersed with shots of shows.

Reaction
The Times, reviewing the first episode, called it "glorious, perceptive and rude" and exposing "the inanity of 24-hour news".

A clip entitled "How To Report The News" from episode two of the second series amassed over two and a half million views on YouTube after it was syndicated by The Huffington Post soon after its first airing. It is currently the ninth 'top rated' video of all-time on the site.

Newswipe won the Entertainment category award at the Royal Television Awards in 2010, beating both Britain's Got Talent and The X Factor, and was also nominated for a BAFTA in the same year for Best Entertainment Programme, however on this occasion losing to Britain's Got Talent.

Episodes

Series 1

Series 2

See also
 Charlie Brooker's Screenwipe
 Charlie Brooker's Gameswipe
 You Have Been Watching
 The Daily Show

References

External links
 

 

2000s British satirical television series
2010s British satirical television series
2009 British television series debuts
2010 British television series endings
BBC Television shows
Television series about television
Television series created by Charlie Brooker
Television series by Endemol
Television series by Zeppotron
British television spin-offs